Bogusław Zych (10 December 1951 – 3 April 1995) was a Polish fencer. He won a bronze medal in the team foil event at the 1980 Summer Olympics. He died in a car crash in Poland.

References

External links
 

1951 births
1995 deaths
Burials at Powązki Military Cemetery
Polish male fencers
Olympic fencers of Poland
Fencers at the 1980 Summer Olympics
Fencers at the 1988 Summer Olympics
Olympic bronze medalists for Poland
Olympic medalists in fencing
Fencers from Warsaw
Road incident deaths in Poland
Medalists at the 1980 Summer Olympics
20th-century Polish people